Francisco Delfim Dias Faria (9 October 1949 – 10 June 2004), commonly known as Chico Faria, was a Portuguese footballer who played as a forward.

Club career
Born in Matosinhos, Faria spent his first 15 seasons as a professional in the Primeira Liga, making his debut in the competition with hometown club Leixões S.C. at only 17. In the 1968 summer he signed for Sporting Clube de Portugal, where he went on to win two national championships and three Taça de Portugal trophies.

Faria subsequently represented S.C. Braga, equalling a career-best ten goals in the 1979–80 campaign to help his team to the ninth position. From 1982 to 1985 he competed in the Segunda Liga, retiring the following year after a spell in amateur football.

International career
Faria gained four caps for Portugal, in five years. His first arrived on 10 May 1972 in a 1–0 away win against Cyprus for the 1974 FIFA World Cup qualifiers, and he scored the only goal in the match played in Nicosia.

|}

Death
Faria died on 10 June 2004 at the age of 54, victim of prolonged pulmonary disease.

External links

1949 births
2004 deaths
Sportspeople from Matosinhos
Portuguese footballers
Association football forwards
Primeira Liga players
Liga Portugal 2 players
Leixões S.C. players
Sporting CP footballers
S.C. Braga players
F.C. Penafiel players
C.S. Marítimo players
Portugal youth international footballers
Portugal under-21 international footballers
Portugal international footballers